The TUM Department of Sport and Health Sciences (TUM SG) is a department of the Technical University of Munich, located at the Zentrale Hochschulsportanlage in the Olympiapark. Its focuses on sports science and health science.

History 
The Department was established in 2002.

Research units 
The Department consists of numerous research units, some of which are shared with other departments:
 Applied Software Engineering (with the Department of Informatics)
 Applied Sport Sciences
 Biomechanics in Sports
 Chronobiology & Health
 Conservative and Rehabilitative Orthopedics
 Didactics in Sport and Health
 Educational Science in Sport and Health
 Epidemiology
 Exercisebiology
 Exercise, nutrition and health
 General Practice (with the School of Medicine)
 Health Economics
 Human Movement Science
 Media and Communications
 Neuromuscular Diagnostics
 Neuropathology (with the School of Medicine)
 Performance Analysis and Sports Informatics
 Preventive Pediatrics
 Preventive and Rehabilitative Sports Medicine (with the School of Medicine)
 Psychosomatic medicine and psychotherapy (with the School of Medicine)
 Social Pediatrics (with the School of Medicine)
 Sociology of Diversity
 Sport and Health Management
 Sport Equipment and Sport Materials (with the Department of Mechanical Engineering)
 Sport Psychology
 Sports Orthopedics (with the School of Medicine)

Rankings 

In the Shanghai Ranking's 2021 Global Ranking of Sport Science Schools and Departments, the TUM Department of Sport and Health Sciences is ranked 31st in the world and 2nd in Germany (after the German Sport University Cologne).

References 

 
2002 establishments in Germany
Educational institutions established in 2002